Lexington is a village along the Clear Fork River in Troy Township and Washington Township in Richland County in the U.S. state of Ohio. It is part of the Mansfield, Ohio Metropolitan Statistical Area. The population was 4,822 at the 2010 census, an increase from 4,165 in 2000.

The Mid-Ohio Sports Car Course is located just outside Lexington in Troy Township.  This venue hosted an annual round of the CART series from 1990 to 2003, has hosted the IndyCar Series since 2007, has hosted the NASCAR Xfinity Series since 2013, hosts Honda Super Bikes, and Vintage Bikes in addition to a few other annual high-profile events.

History
Lexington was founded by Amariah Watson Jr. in 1812, a land speculator who had purchased wide lands locally in order to sell to other settlers. During the 1800s, Lexington had many taverns, hotels, and grist mills — most of which at one time or another burned to the ground. In the 19th century, leading members of the community were William Cockley Thad and Martin Kell, Les Griebling, Erwin Castor, Sgt. Patrick Gass, and Jacob Cook. The first road constructed through town was what is now State Route 97, and the second was what is now Lexington-Ontario Road.

Lexington was first inhabited by the Delaware, Wyandot and Mohawk Indians. These tribes inhabited long houses in permanent villages and cultivated crops such as corn, beans, and squash to complement their diet of hunted meat and foraged berries and herbs. The Indians were friendly with Watson when he and his family moved into the area until Watson's pig ate their baby. The Indians demanded Watson's newborn daughter, who was the first white child born in Lexington, as replacement to their own. Watson settled the argument by agreeing to give the Indians the pig instead. Watson chose to name his new home Lexington. He chose this out of respect for his father who fought in the Revolutionary War of which the first battle was fought in Lexington, Massachusetts. In 1813, Watson built a water-powered sawmill along the Clear Fork River. The mill made work easier and attracted more and more settlers. Business owners used the gristmills for their woolen and saw mills and also distilleries.

The first tavern was built in 1815 by Jacob Cook. It was called "Cook's Tavern" and the first grocery store was built in 1825 by William Damsell. It was in 1839 that Lexington was recognized as a village by the federal government. In 1850 the railroad made its path through Lexington and this contributed to much of the business activity and travel for the settlers. Also by 1850 Lexington was booming and anyone could get anything they needed from Lexington and its resources. By 1853 there were over 50 established businesses in Lexington, many of which competed with each other, providing superior products and services to their customers.

The cemetery is on land originally owned by Amariah Watson himself. It wasn't until 1857 that the village fenced it in to allow a more safe resting place. The sexton house was built in 1863 and the row of maple trees was later planted in 1889. The Lexington Square was once decorated with a Civil War Gatling gun. In 1958 the village of Lexington donated the gun to the Smithsonian Institution in Washington, D.C., and it can still be found there today.

A structure still standing in Lexington from 1843 is known as the "Old Stone House". It was built by James Gass and was host to many runaway slaves traveling along the Underground Railroad. The owners today believe that slaves were hidden in a secret closet. Benjamin Gass took 11-12 slaves in a wagon to Springfield Township and those slaves eventually made their way to Canada. A farm on Texter Road owned by Samuel McClure was also part of the underground railroad and George Mitchell hid slaves in his home and water-powered mill, located near the intersection of today's routes 97 and 314. Many more families in Lexington helped and hid slaves making their way to freedom. While there is no list of names there was a protracted court case against certain citizens who were charged with helping slaves.

Harry F. Smith is another figure worthy of taking note in Lexington's history. Smith grew up in Lexington and is responsible for the first outdoor lighting system that was powered by steam in 1894. Smith later founded Smith Gas Power Company which was Lexington's largest business at the time and then he sold it to General Motors in 1918. After retirement Smith was involved in helping create Lexington's water system and became known as the "Father of the Clear Fork Reservoir".

Geography

Demographics

2010 census
As of the census of 2010, there were 4,822 people, 1,970 households, and 1,366 families living in the village. The racial makeup of the village was 96.3% White, 1.2% African American, 0.2% Native American, 1.0% Asian, 0.1% from other races, and 1.2% from two or more races. Hispanic or Latino of any race were 1.2% of the population.

There were 1,970 households, of which 32.8% had children under the age of 18 living with them, 52.5% were married couples living together, 12.8% had a female householder with no husband present, 4.0% had a male householder with no wife present, and 30.7% were non-families. 26.4% of all households were made up of individuals, and 8.9% had someone living alone who was 65 years of age or older. The average household size was 2.41 and the average family size was 2.91.

The median age in the village was 39.9 years. 25% of residents were under the age of 18; 8.2% were between the ages of 18 and 24; 24% were from 25 to 44; 27.9% were from 45 to 64; and 14.9% were 65 years of age or older. The gender makeup of the village was 47.6% male and 52.4% female.

2000 census
As of the census of 2000, there were 4,165 people, 1,626 households, and 1,230 families living in the village. The population density was 1,134.7 people per square mile (438.2/km2). There were 1,686 housing units at an average density of 459.3 per square mile (177.4/km2). The racial makeup of the village was 97.17% White, 1.20% African American, 0.05% Native American, 0.72% Asian, 0.07% Pacific Islander, 0.43% from other races, and 0.36% from two or more races. Hispanic or Latino of any race were 0.89% of the population.

There were 1,626 households, out of which 38.4% had children under the age of 18 living with them, 61.3% were married couples living together, 11.6% had a female householder with no husband present, and 24.3% were non-families. 21.3% of all households were made up of individuals, and 7.3% had someone living alone who was 65 years of age or older. The average household size was 2.56 and the average family size was 2.98.

In the village, the population was spread out, with 28.1% under the age of 18, 7.3% from 18 to 24, 28.5% from 25 to 44, 25.2% from 45 to 64, and 10.9% who were 65 years of age or older. The median age was 37 years. For every 100 females there were 92.9 males. For every 100 females age 18 and over, there were 87.8 males.

The median income for a household in the village was $48,028, and the median income for a family was $57,313. Males had a median income of $47,857 versus $24,954 for females. The per capita income for the village was $23,800. About 1.5% of families and 2.5% of the population were below the poverty line, including 0.9% of those under age 18 and 7.1% of those age 65 or over.

Education
Lexington Local School District operates three elementary schools, one junior high school, and Lexington High School.   Currently, a new Junior High and High School is being constructed, with a new Elementry School to be built at a later date.

Lexington has a public library, a branch of the Mansfield–Richland County Public Library.

Notable people

 John Peter Altgeld, a governor of Illinois
 Olive San Louie Anderson, scholar and author
 R. C. Chambers (1832–1901),19th-century businessman, minerals miner, banker, politician, sheriff, and silver mine supervisor
 Jamie Feick, player in the NBA
 Candice Millard, writer, journalist
 Cade Stover, Ohio Mr. Football, 2018
 Hannah Stevens: 2017 United States National Champion, 3x US National Team Member, 10th fastest women in US history 100M backstroke

Public Safety
Law Enforcement - Lexington Police Department
Fire & EMS - Troy Township Fire Department

References

External links
 Village website
 

Villages in Richland County, Ohio
Villages in Ohio